Edward John Scheiwe (February 25, 1918 – June 19, 1997) was an American professional basketball and minor league baseball player. In basketball, he played for the Oshkosh All-Stars and Chicago American Gears in the National Basketball League between 1943 and 1945. He averaged 2.8 points per game. In baseball, he played for the Milwaukee Brewers (American Association; 1944), Kansas City Blues (1944), St. Paul Saints (1945), Mobile Bears (1945), and the Oklahoma City Indians (1946).

References

1918 births
1997 deaths
American men's basketball players
United States Navy personnel of World War II
Baseball players from Chicago
Basketball players from Chicago
Chicago American Gears players
Forwards (basketball)
Guards (basketball)
Kansas City Blues (baseball) players
Military personnel from Illinois
Milwaukee Brewers (minor league) players
Mobile Bears players
Oklahoma City Indians players
Oshkosh All-Stars players
St. Paul Saints (AA) players
Wisconsin Badgers baseball players
Wisconsin Badgers men's basketball players